The Hard Way may refer to:

Books 
 The Hard Way, a 2006 novel by Lee Child featuring fictional character Jack Reacher

 The Hard Way, the eighth trade paperback collection of the comic book series 100 Bullets

Film and TV 
 The Hard Way (1916 film), a British silent movie directed by Walter West
 The Hard Way (1943 film), an American drama starring Ida Lupino
 The Hard Way (1980 film), a British made-for-TV film starring Patrick McGoohan and Lee Van Cleef
 The Hard Way (1991 film), an American comedy film with Michael J. Fox and James Woods
 The Hard Way (2019 film), an American action film with Michael Jai White and Luke Goss that premiered on Netflix

Music 
 The Hard Way, an electronic music band consisting of Limewax, Bong-Ra, and DJ Thrasher

Albums
 Hard Way, a 1990 album by Show-Ya
 The Hard Way, a1990 album by Steve Earle
 The Hard Way, a 1992 album by Clint Black
 The Hard Way, a 2004 album by American rap group 213
 The Hard Way, a 2004 album by Owsley
 The Hard Way, a 2004 album by Tinsley Ellis
 The Hard Way, a 2008 album by James Hunter

Songs
"The Hard Way", a 1945 song by Jimmy Van Heusen; Johnny Burke (lyricist)
 "The Hard Way" , a song by The Kinks from the 1976 album Schoolboys in Disgrace
 "The Hard Way", a song by Johnny Cash from the 1981 album The Baron
 "The Hard Way" , a single by Mary Chapin Carpenter from the 1992 album Come On Come On
 "The Hard Way", a song by Kasey Chambers from the 1999 album The Captain
 "The Hard Way", a song by Fort Minor from the 2005 album The Rising Tied
 "The Hard Way" , a 2007 single by Thirsty Merc
 "The Hardway", a song by Christian music band dc Talk on their 1992 album Free at Last
 "The Hard Way" , a song by the Turnpike Troubadours from the 2017 album A Long Way from Your Heart

See also
Hardway (disambiguation)